Talastine (trade name Ahanon) is an antihistamine.

Synthesis
The amide proton from 4-Benzylphalazone is abstracted with KOH, which is then alkylated with diethylaminoethyl chloride.

References

External links 
 
 

Phthalazines
H1 receptor antagonists
Lactams
Benzyl compounds